The Padang (Malay for 'field') is an open playing field located within the Downtown Core of the Central Area in Singapore. It includes the Padang Cricket Ground. The Padang is surrounded by several important landmarks, which include Saint Andrew's Cathedral, City Hall, the Old Supreme Court Building and the City Hall MRT station.

Due to its prime location and historical significance, it has been used as a venue for a variety of events, including the National Day Parades some years due to the first ever National Day Parade being held there in 1966, the recently-held Singapore's Golden Jubilee Year in 2015, and later in 2019 honouring the bicentennial anniversary since the founding of modern Singapore in 1819. Since 1995, it has been planned that the NDP would be held there for every five years, the main venue for that major event is at The Float @ Marina Bay (previously the Former National Stadium). On 4 November 2018, Padang hosted the live finals of the Chinese-Mandopop singing reality competition SPOP Sing!.

On 3 August 2019, Deputy Prime Minister Heng Swee Keat announced that the Padang will be gazetted as a National Monument along with the Anderson Bridge, Cavenagh Bridge and the Elgin Bridge (collectively known as the Singapore River Bridges), due to the historical significance - these include the World War II surrender in 1945, National Day Parade and the signing of the country's formation in the British colony and self-independence. The Preservation of Monuments (Amendment) Act will allow open spaces or the whole of the area to be gazetted as national monuments, such as Fort Siloso and Padang.

On 8 August 2022, it was announced that the Padang would be gazetted as the nation's 75th national monument on 9 August, the 57th anniversary of the Republic's independence.

History

References
Victor R Savage, Brenda S A Yeoh (2004), Toponymics – A Study of Singapore Street Names, Eastern University Press, 

National squares
Downtown Core (Singapore)
Landmarks in Singapore
Places in Singapore
National monuments of Singapore